Humphrey Bogart (1899–1957) was an American actor.

Bogart or Boggart may also refer to:

People
 Bogart (surname), lists people with surname Bogart
 Bogart Rogers (1897–1966), American motion picture writer and producer and World War I flying ace
 "Bogart", nickname of American Idol contestant Bo Bice

Places
 Bogart, Georgia, a town
 Bogart, Ohio, an unincorporated community
 Bogart, Ontario, Canada, a settlement
 Bogart's, a Cincinnati, Ohio, music venue
 Bogart's (Long Beach, California), a former music venue.

Magical creature
 Boggart or bogart, a creature in Celtic mythology
 Boggart, a magical creature in the Harry Potter universe
 Boggart (Dungeons & Dragons) a magical creature in the Dungeons and Dragons universe.

Other uses
 A variant of the fedora (hat)
 "Bogart", a song by Nik Kershaw
  Slang term used to describe a marijuana user who doesn't pass the "joint".